Håkon Steinar Giil (born 28 January 1943 in Hyllestad) is a Norwegian politician for the Centre Party.

He was elected to the Norwegian Parliament from Sogn og Fjordane in 1993, but was not re-elected in 1997. Instead he served in the position of deputy representative during the term 1997–2001.

Giil served as mayor of Hyllestad municipality from 1987 to 1993. He was originally a member of the executive committee of the municipality council, in 1983–1987, and returned to this position from 1999 to 2015.

References

1943 births
Living people
Members of the Storting
Centre Party (Norway) politicians
20th-century Norwegian politicians